Y. Ramakrishna (1 July 1927 – 24 May 1997), was an Indian politician, Advocate, Agriculturist and freedom fighter.

See also
  Indian Independence Activists

References 

1927 births
1997 deaths
People from Kolar district
Indian industrialists
Indian Hindus
Indian National Congress politicians from Karnataka
Janata Party politicians
India MPs 1989–1991
Lok Sabha members from Karnataka
Mysore MLAs 1957–1962
Mysore MLAs 1962–1967
Mysore MLAs 1967–1972
Karnataka MLAs 1978–1983
Karnataka MLAs 1983–1985
Karnataka MLAs 1994–1999